Francesca is a female given name.

Francesca  may also refer to
 Francesca (film), a 2009 Romanian drama film
 Francesca (planthopper), a genus of achilid planthoppers
 Hurricane Francesca (disambiguation), several Pacific tropical cyclones
 "Francesca", a song by Mêlée
 "Francesca", a song by The Needs

See also
Francisca (also spelled "fransisca"), a throwing axe used widely by Germanic peoples